C. festivus may refer to:

Cantharidus festivus, a sea snail species
Chlaenius festivus, a ground beetle species